David Neil Butcher (born 2 October 1969) is a former English cricketer. Butcher was a right-handed batsman who bowled slow left-arm orthodox. He was born in Colchester, Essex.

Butcher made his debut for Devon in the Minor Counties Championship against Berkshire in 1992. From 1992 to 1994, he represented Devon in 14 Championship matches, the last of which came against Cornwall.  In 1992, he played his only List A match for Devon, which came against Kent in the 1992 NatWest Trophy.  In this match he scored an unbeaten single run and with the ball he took the wickets of Neil Taylor and Carl Hooper.

References

External links
David Butcher at ESPNcricinfo
David Butcher at CricketArchive

1969 births
Living people
Sportspeople from Colchester
English cricketers
Devon cricketers